Sarah Cryer (14 February 1848 – 30 August 1929) was a New Zealand farmer, community worker and benefactor. She was born in Wroughton, Wiltshire, England, on 14 February 1848.

References

1848 births
1929 deaths
New Zealand farmers
New Zealand women farmers
New Zealand social workers
New Zealand philanthropists
English emigrants to New Zealand
People from Wroughton
19th-century New Zealand people